The City of Westminster is a home rule municipality located in Adams and Jefferson counties, Colorado, United States. The city population was 116,317 at the 2020 United States Census with 71,240 residing in Adams County and 45,077 residing in Jefferson County. Westminster is the eighth most populous city in Colorado. The city is a part of the Denver–Aurora–Lakewood, CO Metropolitan Statistical Area and the Front Range Urban Corridor.

History
 Gold discovered in the South Platte River Valley in 1858 brought national attention to the area that would become Westminster, Colorado. The promise of fortune and The Homestead Act of 1862 encouraged many pioneers from the east to settle in Colorado rather than continue on to California. Before the settlements came, wildlife like antelope and buffalo made their homes in the area. There is also evidence of Arapaho Indians near the Crown Point (Gregory Hill) area. Westminsters' first permanent settler was Kentucky farmer Pleasant DeSpain, who built his home in 1870 on 160 acres (near what is now West 76th Avenue and Lowell Street). The area became known as DeSpain Junction and attracted other settlers including Edward Bruce Bowles, who in 1881 constructed a brick Italianate house now known as the Bowles House. It was listed on the National Register of Historic Places in 1988. The village of DeSpain Junction grew into a small farming community and continued to attract new settlers despite the difficulty of farming in Colorado's arid climate. Connecticut real estate developer C.J. Harris arrived in DeSpain Junction in 1885 and purchased the DeSpain farm, among others. Harris combined the separate homesteads and divided it into smaller tracts of land, which he sold to fruit farmers. Harris renamed DeSpain Junction with his own name and the area was referred to as Harris, Colorado. In 1890, New Yorker Henry T. Mayham convinced the Denver Presbytery to build a university on land that he owned in Harris. After delays caused by the depression of 1893, the school was built from red sandstone quarried in Colorado's Red Rocks region. The curriculum was patterned after Princeton University and was referred to as the "Princeton of the West". The school was incorporated as Westminster University of Colorado, and classes began in 1908 with one year's tuition costing $50 ($1,411 in 2018). The school ceased operating in 1917, when all students in attendance left to fight in World War I. In the following decade it operated as a church and school. In 1911, Harris voted to incorporate as a city and changed its name to Westminster, in honor of the university which is now on the National Register of Historic Places.

In July 2006, it was ranked as the 24th best place to live in the US by Money magazine.

Bell Tower
Westminster City Hall features a 14-story bell tower topped by a pyramid shaped steel mesh structure. The 130-foot spire, which is widely known and referenced as a community landmark, was first conceptualized as a symbolic tie and tribute to the clock tower of Westminster Palace in England known as Big Ben. The unveiling of the Bell Tower in 1986 was attended by the then mayor of Westminster, England. An English Oak can be seen on the City Hall property today- a gift to Westminster, Colorado, from Westminster, England.

Geography
Westminster is located in western Adams County and northeastern Jefferson County at  (39.862, -105.048). It is bordered to the north by Broomfield, to the northeast by Thornton, to the east by Northglenn and Federal Heights, to the southeast by Sherrelwood, Twin Lakes and Berkley, and to the south by Arvada.

At the 2020 United States Census, the town had a total area of  including  of water.

Demographics

As of the census of 2000, there were 100,940 people, 38,343 households, and 26,034 families residing in the city. The racial makeup of the city was 84.19% White, 1.23% African American, 0.74% Native American, 5.48% Asian, 0.08% Pacific Islander, 5.52% from other races, and 2.76% from two or more races. Hispanic or Latino of any race were 15.23% of the population.

There were 38,343 households, out of which 35.7% had children under the age of 18 living with them, 53.6% were married couples living together, 9.6% had a female householder with no husband present, and 32.1% were non-families. 23.7% of all households were made up of individuals, and 4.5% had someone living alone who was 65 years of age or older.  The average household size was 2.62 and the average family size was 3.15.

In the city, the population was spread out, with 26.9% under the age of 18, 9.6% from 18 to 24, 36.0% from 25 to 44, 21.0% from 45 to 64, and 6.5% who were 65 years of age or older.  The median age was 33 years. For every 100 females, there were 100.2 males.  For every 100 females age 18 and over, there were 98.9 males.

The median income for a household in the city was $56,323, and the median income for a family was $63,776. Males had a median income of $41,539 versus $31,568 for females. The per capita income for the city was $25,482.  About 3.1% of families and 4.7% of the population were below the poverty line, including 5.1% of those under age 18 and 6.3% of those age 65 or over.

Transportation
Westminster is intersected by several state highways: I-25, US 36, US 287, SH 95, SH 121, and SH 128.

The Denver Regional Transportation District (RTD) provides bus service to Westminster connecting it to Boulder and Denver via The Flatiron Flyer, a bus rapid transit service that travels in the US 36 express lanes.

The Westminster Center park-n-Ride operated by the RTD is located on both sides of U.S. 36 and is immediately across Sheridan Boulevard from the site. Approximately 1,546 people per weekday board at this facility, with approximately 498 buses per day serving this park-n-Ride.

RTD opened the B Line to the public in 2016 which brings commuter rail service between downtown Denver and Westminster Station. The 6 miles of commuter rail transports riders from the historic center of Westminster to the dynamic Union Station Transit Center where they can connect to the C/D, E, and W light rail lines, the University of Colorado A Line to Denver International Airport, as well as Local and Regional buses, and the FreeMallRide and FreeMetroRide downtown shuttles.

Westminster is served by Denver International Airport and nearby Rocky Mountain Metropolitan Airport.

Economy
Companies based in Westminster include DigitalGlobe and the Western Fuels Association.

Top employers

Westminsters' top employers represent leading companies in high-tech, medical, energy, and other expanding fields. In 2019 the top ten primary employers in Westminster, ranked by number of employees included:

Education
High schools in or near Westminster include the Academy of Charter Schools, Hidden Lake High School, Jefferson Academy High School, Legacy High School, Mountain Range High School, Northglenn High School, Pomona High School, Standley Lake High School, and Westminster High School.  In 2010 Adams County School District 50 opened a new Westminster High School replacing both the existing Westminster High School and Ranum High School, which graduated its last class that year.

Shepherd of the Valley Lutheran School is a pre-k3 through 8th grade Christian school of the Wisconsin Evangelical Lutheran Synod in Westminster.

Open space
Westminster has an extensive trail network and open space system. Other trails parallel the Farmers' High Line Canal, Walnut Creek, and Little Dry Creek.

Westminster began preserving open spaces in 1985 when voters first approved a sales tax specifically earmarked to acquire and maintain open space. The city now owns more than 3,000 acres in all parts of Westminster. The city has preserved large expanses of land in the Standley Lake Regional Park, and the Westminster Hills area, among others. Westminster City Park, City Park Recreation Center, and many other neighborhood and community parks provide various recreation facilities. Westminster has several golf courses, including Legacy Ridge Golf Course, The Heritage Golf Course at Westmoor, Walnut Creek Golf Course and the Hyland Hills golf course.

Downtown Westminster intersects directly with the new U.S. 36 Bikeway linking the largest trail system in the Front Range with over 145 miles.

Shopping
Westminster is home to The Orchard Town Center, an outdoor mall featuring over 90 speciality retailers, dining and entertainment located at the intersection of I-25 and 144th Avenue The Orchard Town Center mall is anchored by an AMC theatre, JC Penney, and Macy's

The city's major mall had been the Westminster Mall, demolished in 2012 to make way for the Downtown Westminster development.

Downtown Westminster

Downtown Westminster is a 105-acre site almost equidistant between downtown Denver and Boulder. The new downtown will feature 18 acres of parks and public space. It integrates Smart City functionality to reduce consumption of water and energy and will have smart streetlights, parking garages, and meters. 
Development began with the completion of over 300 housing units, including 118 affordable housing units. Downtown Westminster features a now-open Alamo Drafthouse Cinema and a 125-room boutique hotel, the Origin Hotel, with an opening, slated , to be possibly July 2020. The Origin Hotel will offer corner suites overlooking Downtown Westminster, a fully equipped fitness center, an independent restaurant concept and 3,000 square feet of meeting space.

Downtown Westminster is planned to house 300 hotel rooms, 2,300 multi-family, condo and townhouse residential units, 2 million square feet of collaborative and class A office space, and 750,000 square feet of retail space.

Notable people

Notable individuals who were born in or have lived in Westminster include figure skater Mariah Bell, Texas newspaper publisher Frank Willis Mayborn, silent film actor Pete Morrison.

See also

Colorado
Bibliography of Colorado
Index of Colorado-related articles
Outline of Colorado
List of counties in Colorado
List of places in Colorado
List of municipalities in Colorado
List of statistical areas in Colorado
Front Range Urban Corridor
North Central Colorado Urban Area
Denver-Aurora, CO Combined Statistical Area
Denver-Aurora-Lakewood, CO Metropolitan Statistical Area
Rocky Flats National Wildlife Refuge

References

External links

City of Westminster official website
CDOT map of Westminster
Westminster Historical Society

 
Populated places established in 1859
Cities in Colorado
Cities in Jefferson County, Colorado
Cities in Adams County, Colorado
1859 establishments in Kansas Territory